D'Cota Dixon (born November 20, 1994) is an American football safety who is a free agent. He played college football at Wisconsin. The Oak Hill, Florida native played high school football at New Smyrna Beach High School.

College career
Dixon started his sophomore, junior, and senior seasons on the Wisconsin Badgers football team. Injuries hampered his senior campaign, but he was still invited to the 2019 NFL Scouting Combine.

Professional career
At the combine, Dixon ran a 4.81-second 40 yard dash, registered 20 reps on the 225-pound bench press, a 33.5-inch vertical jump and a 119-inch broad jump. After his senior season, Dixon was named the Jason Witten Collegiate Man of the Year award for exceptional character.

On May 13, 2019, Dixon signed with the Tampa Bay Buccaneers as an undrafted free agent. On August 8, 2019, Dixon was placed on injured reserve. Dixon was waived by the Buccaneers during final roster cuts on September 5, 2020, and was signed to the practice squad the following day. He was released on October 20.

Personal life
Growing up in a crime-ridden Miami neighborhood, Dixon was raised by a single mother who was sometimes beaten by her boyfriend. D'Cota and a brother were eventually placed into foster care after living in a house with no working refrigerator, oftentimes eating out of a styrofoam cooler. His father was a drug addict for much of Dixon's young life until he died of a heart attack when Dixon was in high school. After struggling with anger issues early in life, Dixon eventually became more mild-mannered, citing his Christian faith.

References

External links
 Wisconsin Badgers bio

1994 births
Living people
American football safeties
Players of American football from Florida
Sportspeople from Volusia County, Florida
Tampa Bay Buccaneers players
Wisconsin Badgers football players